Paul Robert Klein (1946–2020) was an American art dealer. He owned and operated the Klein Art Works gallery in Chicago until 2004. He was chosen as 2006 Man of the Year by the Chicago Society of Artists.

Life and work
Klein owned and operated Klein Art Works, a cutting edge art gallery in Chicago until 2004. Originally located in River North Gallery District, in 1981 it moved to River West in 1989 contributing to the development of that gallery area.

He worked for the Bridge Group providing financial and legacy planning for collectors. He was the first executive director of the Chicago ART Project. From 2004 to 2008 he was the art curator for the  expansion of McCormick Place, the editor of ArtLetter, and wrote for "Chicago Life" which was distributed regionally in The New York Times.

Klein was a frequent panelist, appearing with Dawoud Bey,  Tony Fitzpatrick, Wesley Kimler, Juan Angel Chavez, Joyce Owens, and Hamza Walker.

The Museum of Contemporary Art Chicago's 12 x 12 program of presenting one Chicago artist a month is attributable to him.

Death
He died on October 11, 2020 in Chicago. He is survived by his wife and children.

Awards
2006 Man of the Year, Chicago Society of Artists

See also
 Protest art

References

External links

1946 births
2020 deaths
American male writers
Activists from Chicago
Place of birth missing